Self-Portrait in a Black Beret and Gold Chain is a 1654 self-portrait attributed to Rembrandt, now in the Museum Schloss Wilhelmshöhe in Kassel.

Sources
http://www.rembrandtdatabase.org/Rembrandt/painting/30522/self-portrait-with-black-baret-and-golden-chain

Paintings in the collection of the Gemäldegalerie Alte Meister (Kassel)
Black Beret
1654 paintings
Portraits of men
17th-century portraits